Ditriaena is a genus of beetles in the family Buprestidae, containing the following species:

 Ditriaena incerta Cobos, 1975
 Ditriaena purpurascens (Waterhouse, 1882)
 Ditriaena romeroi Hornburg & Gottwald, 2012.
 Ditriaena sexspinosa (Waterhouse, 1889)
 Ditriaena sphericollis (Laporte & Gory, 1836)

References

Buprestidae genera